Tressandans is a commune in the Doubs department in the Bourgogne-Franche-Comté region of eastern France.

Geography
It lies on the border of the department of Haute-Saône.

Population

See also
 Communes of the Doubs department

References

External links

 Tressandans on the regional Web site 

Communes of Doubs